Eric Thorold Dalton (26 December 1910 – 11 January 1976) was  a former Australian rules footballer who played with Collingwood and Essendon in the Victorian Football League (VFL).

Dalton later served in the Australian Army during World War II.

Notes

External links 
		
Eric Dalton's profile at Collingwood Forever

1910 births
1976 deaths
Australian rules footballers from Victoria (Australia)
Collingwood Football Club players
Essendon Football Club players